Thomas Benton Catron (October 6, 1840May 15, 1921) was an American politician and lawyer who was influential in the establishment of the U.S. state of New Mexico, and served as one of its first United States Senators.

Catron was a native of Missouri and a graduate of the University of Missouri. He was a Confederate States Army veteran of the American Civil War. After the war, he moved to New Mexico Territory, where he learned Spanish, studied law, and attained admission to the bar. A Republican even though most Southerners were Democrats, Catron soon made his mark in both law and politics, including serving as a district attorney, territorial attorney general (1869-1872), and United States Attorney for New Mexico (1872-1878). He later served on the New Mexico Territorial Council (1884, 1888, 1889), as the Territorial Delegate to Congress (1895-1897), President of the New Mexico Bar Association (1895), and Mayor of Santa Fe (1906-1908).

In addition to practicing law, Catron used his knowledge of New Mexico's old Spanish land grants to acquire title to more than 3 million acres, making him the largest landholder in the state. When New Mexico achieved statehood, the legislature elected Catron one of the state's first U.S. Senators. He served from 1912 to 1916, and was an unsuccessful candidate for reelection in 1916. He died in Santa Fe, and was buried in Santa Fe's Fairview Cemetery.

Early life
Catron was born near Lexington, Missouri on October 6, 1840, a son of John Catron and Mary (Fletcher) Catron, and was named after Missouri Senator Thomas Hart Benton.  He was educated in Lexington's public schools and at Masonic College in Lexington.  He graduated from the University of Missouri in 1860.

Civil War
During the American Civil War Catron joined the Confederate States Army, serving in Hiram M. Bledsoe's Battery, a unit of Sterling Price's command.  Catron took part in the battles of Carthage, Wilson's Creek, Second Lexington, and Pea Ridge.  By the end of the war Catron was a first lieutenant in command of the 3rd Missouri Battery.  In the latter stages of the war he served during combat in Tennessee, Alabama, and Mississippi, before surrendering in Mississippi at the end of the war as part of Richard Taylor's command.

Post-Civil War
Catron returned to Missouri after the war and began to study law. In 1866 he moved to the Territory of New Mexico, living in Las Cruces before settling in Mesilla. He traveled to New Mexico with two wagon loads of flour, which he sold to finance his legal studies, and a Spanish grammar book, which he used to begin to learn the language.  (He soon became fluent by living in Spanish speaking communities and speaking only Spanish.)  Catron completed his legal studies and was admitted to the bar in 1867.

Political career
Unlike most Southerners who had supported the Confederacy, Catron was a Republican.  Almost as soon as he began to practice Catron was appointed District Attorney for the Third Judicial District (present day Doña Ana County), and served until 1868.

In 1869 he was appointed Attorney General of the New Mexico Territory.  In 1872 he was appointed United States Attorney for the District of New Mexico, an office previously held by his law partner, Civil War colleague and fellow Republican Stephen Benton Elkins, who had been elected to Congress.  Catron served as U.S. Attorney until 1878.

While holding office as U.S. Attorney Catron moved to Santa Fe. In 1884 Catron was elected to the New Mexico Territorial Council, and he served again in 1888 and 1890. In 1892 Catron ran unsuccessfully for Delegate to Congress. He ran again in 1894 and won, serving one term  March 4, 1895 to March 3, 1897. From 1895 to 1896 Catron was President of the New Mexico Bar Association. He was an unsuccessful candidate for reelection to Congress in 1896, and served on the Territorial Council again in 1899 and 1905.

From 1906 to 1908 Catron served as Mayor of Santa Fe.

Land acquisition
As a lawyer familiar with the intricacies of old Mexican land grants, Catron gained an interest in or clear title to 34 grants totaling .  As a member of the group of land speculators known as 'The Santa Fe Ring,' he was the largest single landowner in New Mexico, and one of the largest landowners in the United States.

United States Senator
Catron was an early advocate for New Mexico statehood, and in the early 1900s marshaled the territorial Republican Party to lobby Republicans at the national level for New Mexico's admission to the Union.

When New Mexico was admitted as the 47th state in 1912, The New Mexico State Legislature elected Catron as one of the state's first U.S. Senators.  Catron won the "long term" (four years), while Albert B. Fall won the "short term" (one year).  Catron took office on March 27, 1912.

To win election to the Senate, Catron made a personal alliance with Fall (later to be involved in the Teapot Dome scandal), ensuring that each of them would be elected.  This alliance antagonized New Mexicans of Spanish heritage, who had hoped that one of their own would become a Senator.

At the start of his Senate career Catron served as Chairman of the Committee on Expenditures in the Interior Department.  In 1916 he was a candidate for reelection, but lost the Republican nomination to Frank A. Hubbell.  Hubbell went on to lose the general election to Andrieus A. Jones.

After leaving the Senate Catron returned to Santa Fe, where he resumed his law practice and business interests, and served in local offices including President of the Board of Education.

Catron was mentioned as a Senate candidate in 1918 if Fall did not run for reelection, but Fall decided to run, received the Republican nomination, and won another term.

Retirement, death and burial
After leaving the Senate, Catron attempted unsuccessfully to receive an appointment as Ambassador to Chile.  In retirement Catron continued to reside in Santa Fe.  He died in Santa Fe on May 15, 1921 and was interred in a mausoleum at Fairview Cemetery.

Family

In 1878 Catron married Julia Anna Walz (March 28, 1857November 8, 1909), a native of Ohio.  She had lived in Mankato, Minnesota, was a graduate of Oberlin College, and was teaching school when she met Catron.  They had five children, four of whom lived to adulthood: John Walz; Charles Christopher; Thomas Benton II; and Fletcher Arthur

Awards and honors
Catron received an honorary Master of Arts degree from the University of Missouri in 1868, and in 1920 the University of Missouri awarded him an honorary LL.D.

Catron County, New Mexico is named in his honor.

See also
Albert Jennings Fountain

References

Further reading
Caffey, David L. Chasing the Santa Fe Ring (2014).
Duran, Tobias (1984) "Francisco Chavez, Thomas B. Catron, and Organized Political Violence in Santa Fe in the 1890s." New Mexico Historical Review 59: pp. 291–310.
Garraty, John A. and Carnes, Mark C. (eds.) (1999) American National Biography. Oxford University Press, New York, .
Jacobsen, Joel K (1993) "An Excess of Law in Lincoln County: Thomas Catron, Samuel Axtell, and the Lincoln County War." New Mexico Historical Review  68: pp. 133–51.
Lamar, Howard R. (ed.) (1998) The New Encyclopedia of the American West. Yale University Press, New Haven, CT, .
Taylor, Michael L.  “The Library of Thomas B. Catron and the Transformation of New Mexico,” Libraries: Culture, History, and Society v. 2, no. 1 (2018): 1-23.
 Westphall, Victor (1988) "Thomas Benton Catron: A Historical Defense." New Mexico Historical Review 63: pp. 43–57.
 Westphall, Victor (1973) Thomas Benton Catron and His Era. University of Arizona Press, Tucson, .

External links
 Inventory of the Thomas B. Catron Papers, University of New Mexico, University Libraries, Center for Southwest Research

Confederate States Army officers
Mayors of Santa Fe, New Mexico
Republican Party United States senators from New Mexico
1840 births
1921 deaths
Delegates to the United States House of Representatives from New Mexico Territory
Members of the New Mexico Territorial Legislature
People of the New Mexico Territory
People from Lexington, Missouri
University of Missouri alumni
New Mexico Republicans